Elizabeth Macarthur High School (abbreviated as EMHS) is a government-funded co-educational dual modality partially academically selective and comprehensive secondary day school, located in Narellan Vale, an outer south-western suburb of Sydney, New South Wales, Australia. 

Named in honour of Elizabeth Macarthur, wife of John Macarthur, both Australian agricultural pioneers, the school was established in 1988 and caters for approximately 1,200 students from Year 7 to Year 12, including approximately sixty indigenous students. The school was the first partially selective high school in the Macarthur region, found on the outskirts of greater metropolitan Sydney.

Overview 
Established in 1988, the school officially became an academically selective school in 2010, where currently only Years 7-11 are included within the selective stream. The entrance score for Elizabeth Macarthur High School from the Selective High Schools Entry Test currently sits at around 172, low in comparison to other state selective schools. Its rank, according to a document produced by The Sydney Morning Herald in 2009 through NAPLAN results, was 386th in New South Wales, its highest rank being equal 90th for Year 9 Reading with eight other high schools.

The school is an agricultural high school, capable of providing students with the subject of agriculture. The school has an established performance in livestock shows, such as the Camden Show and the Royal Easter Show, where students who participate do so in sacrifice of their own time.

On 21 June 2019, the school was evacuated due to an unspecified police operation. This inconvenienced the student body of Elizabeth Macarthur, particularly regarding buses and the such, but it was mostly fine. It was also discovered that the reason for the evacuation was a bomb threat.

See also

 List of government schools in New South Wales
 List of selective high schools in New South Wales
 Selective school (New South Wales)

References

External links
 Elizabeth Macarthur High School official website
 
 

Public high schools in Sydney
Educational institutions established in 1988
1988 establishments in Australia
Selective schools in New South Wales
South Western Sydney